Wilhelm von Brandenburg (30 June 1498 – 4 February 1563) was the Archbishop of Riga from 1539 to 1561.

A member of the House of Hohenzollern, Wilhelm was the son of Frederick I, Margrave of Brandenburg-Ansbach, the brother of Albert, Duke of Prussia, and the grandson of Albert III Achilles, Elector of Brandenburg and Casimir IV Jagiellon.

After William's administration as Prince-bishop ended during the Livonian War, Riga became a Free City (1561–1581). He died there on 4 February 1563 was buried in Riga Cathedral.

Ancestry

1498 births
1563 deaths
16th-century Roman Catholic archbishops in Livonia
Archbishops of Riga
Prince-bishops in Livonia
Wilhelm von Brandenburg
German people of Lithuanian descent
German people of Polish descent
Sons of monarchs